Llanybydder railway station also Llanybyther railway station served the town of Llanybydder on the Carmarthen Aberystwyth Line in the Welsh counties of Carmarthenshire and extending into Ceredigion.

History
The Manchester and Milford Railway (M&MR) opened from Pencader to Aberystwyth on 12 August 1867. The line went into receivership from 1875 to 1900.

The Great Western Railway took over the service in 1906, and fully absorbed the line in 1911. The Great Western Railway and the station passed on to British Railways on nationalisation in 1948. It was then closed by the British Railways Board. The OS maps and photographs show that it had two platforms, signal box, weighing machine, a sizeable goods shed and several associated sidings.

Passenger services ran until flooding severely damaged the line south of Aberystwyth in December 1964. A limited service continued running from Carmarthen to Tregaron for a few months after the line was severed, however this was the era of the Beeching Axe and the line was closed to passengers in February 1965.

The line remained open for milk traffic until 1973. The station buildings have been largely demolished and cleared and the site is used as a car park. The main station building and the adjacent goods shed survive; the former is a single-storey red-brick building with yellow-brick dressings, under a pitched slated roof and the latter a rubble-stone building under a pitched slated roof.

References 
Notes

Sources

External links
 Archive Images

Disused railway stations in Carmarthenshire
Railway stations in Great Britain opened in 1866
Railway stations in Great Britain closed in 1965
Former Great Western Railway stations
1866 establishments in Wales
Beeching closures in Wales